John Lyons may refer to: 
John Lyons (Antiguan politician) (1760–1816), Antiguan politician
John Lyons (Royal Navy officer, born 1787) (1787–1872), British admiral
John Charles Lyons (1792–1874), Anglo-Irish landowner, politician, antiquary, and horticulturalist
John Lyons (VC) (1824–1867), Irish soldier in the British army, recipient of the Victoria Cross
John J. Lyons (c. 1881–1945), Secretary of State of New York, 1921–1922
John Lyons (Australian politician) (1885–1948), South Australian politician
John P. Lyons (1876–?), Canadian diver
John Lyons (Longford politician), Irish independent / Labour Party politician, represented Longford-Westmeath, 1922–1927
John Lyons (bishop) (1878–1958), Bishop of Ontario, 1932–1952
John W. Lyons, mayor of Cambridge, Massachusetts 1938–1941
John Lyons (ice hockey) (1900–1971), United States ice hockey player who competed in the 1924 Winter Olympics
J. B. Lyons (1922–2007), John Binignus Lyons, Irish medical historian and writer
John Lyons (hurler) (1923–2005), Irish sportsperson
John Lyons (trade unionist) (1926–2016), British trade union leader
John Lyons (linguist) (1932–2020), British linguist
John Lyons (poet) (born 1933), Trinidad-born poet, artist and educator
John Lyons (actor) (born 1943), British actor
John Lyons (British politician) (born 1949), Labour Party politician
John Lyons (American football coach) (born 1952), American football coach
John Lyons (end) (1911–1981), American football player
Tison v. Arizona (died 1978), American murder victim
John Lyons (footballer) (1956–1982), Welsh footballer
John Lyons (Dublin politician) (born 1977), Irish Labour politician representing Dublin North West 2011–2016
John Lyons (horse trainer), author and horse trainer in the field of natural horsemanship
John Lyons (journalist), Australian journalist

See also
Jack Lyons (disambiguation)
John Lyon (disambiguation)